This is a list of ski areas and resorts in Switzerland.

There is a separate list for the cross-country skiing trails: List of cross-country skiing trails in Switzerland.

Valais and Vaud

Bernese Oberland

Central Switzerland

Graubünden

Eastern Switzerland 

1skilift/chair-lift/cable car; if only one number: total

See also
Swiss Alps
List of mountains of Switzerland accessible by public transport
Lists of tourist attractions in Switzerland

References

 
Ski resorts
Switzerland
Ski resorts